Bruno Josvah Randrianantenaina is a Malagasy politician. A member of the National Assembly of Madagascar, he was elected from the Fampandrosoana Mirindra party; he represents the constituency of Marovoay.

References
Profile on National Assembly site

Year of birth missing (living people)
Living people
Members of the National Assembly (Madagascar)
Fampandrosoana Mirindra politicians
Place of birth missing (living people)